The First Congregational Church of LaMoille is a historic church located at 94 Franklin Street in La Moille, Illinois, United States. The building was constructed in 1867 for La Moille's Congregational church, which was established by Owen Lovejoy in 1840. The church was designed in the Italianate style, which was growing in popularity at the time. Its design features tall arched windows, a tower atop the main entrance, decorative pilasters at the corners, and corbelling along the front cornice. The church originally included several Gothic Revival features as well, such as a spire steeple and pinnacles, but these fell into disrepair and were removed.

The church was added to the National Register of Historic Places on February 16, 1996.

References

Congregational churches in Illinois
Churches completed in 1867
Buildings and structures in Bureau County, Illinois
Italianate architecture in Illinois
Churches on the National Register of Historic Places in Illinois
National Register of Historic Places in Bureau County, Illinois
Italianate church buildings in the United States